Ganga Lake may refer to:
 Ganga Lake (Pakistan)
Ganga Lake (India)
 Ganga Lake (Mongolia)
 Ganga Talao (Mauritius) - Also called Ganga lake and Grand Basin